Proba may refer to:
 people
 Faltonia Betitia Proba, fourth-century Latin poet
 Anicia Faltonia Proba, her niece and the recipient of letters from Saint Augustine and Saint John Chrysostom
 places
 Próba, Łódź Voivodeship, village in the administrative district of Gmina Brzeźnio, within Sieradz County, Łódź Voivodeship, in central Poland.
 Proba, Leningrad Oblast, settlement in Russia 

 other uses
 Proba (bug), a genus of insects in the tribe Mirini
 PROBA, a series of low-cost satellites from the European Space Agency